Witnesses and testimony provide an important and valuable insight into the events which occurred both during and after the Armenian genocide. The Armenian genocide was prepared and carried out by the Ottoman government in 1915 as well as in the following years. As a result of the genocide, as many as 1.5 million Armenians who were living in their ancestral homeland (at that time it was a part of the Ottoman Empire) were deported and murdered.

A number of journalists, diplomats, soldiers, physicians, writers, and missionaries witnessed the Armenian genocide, with hundreds of these witnesses from various European countries (Germany, Austria, Italy) and the United States experiencing the events firsthand. These witnesses have provided testimonies that are highly valued by historians as reliable reports of the tragedy. The eyewitness accounts of non-Armenian diplomats, missionaries and others provide significant evidence about the events and particularly the systematic nature of the deportations and subsequent massacres.

Overview
Among these, missionaries experienced the events first hand and were instrumental in spreading the news about the massacres worldwide. Some missionaries had also provided detailed information about the events to heads of state such as Woodrow Wilson. Many of the missionaries provided clandestine relief and oftentimes saved the lives of many Armenians.

Reacting to numerous eyewitness accounts, James Bryce and Arnold Toynbee compiled statements from survivors and eyewitnesses from other countries including Germany, Italy, the Netherlands, Sweden, and Switzerland, who similarly attested to the systematized massacring of innocent Armenians by Ottoman government forces. In 1916, they published The Treatment of Armenians in the Ottoman Empire, 1915–1916. Although the book has been criticized by Turkish denialists as propaganda to build up support for the war, Bryce had submitted the work to scholars for verification prior to its publication. University of Oxford Regius Professor Gilbert Murray stated of the time, "the evidence of these letters and reports will bear any scrutiny and overpower any skepticism. Their genuineness is established beyond question." Other professors, including Herbert Fisher
of Sheffield University and former American Bar Association president Moorfield Storey, affirmed the same conclusion.

Other eyewitness accounts are from survivors of the Armenian genocide themselves. Today, there are only a "handful" of survivors alive. Many of these accounts were recorded on tape decades after the events. Hundreds of these testimonies and eyewitness accounts will be incorporated into the USC Shoah Foundation Institute for Visual History and Education as part of archival research project for the 100th anniversary of the Armenian genocide.

As asserted by Armenian historian Richard G. Hovannisian, "eyewitness accounts of decisive events may be as valuable as official dispatches and reports. It is in such version especially that the human element becomes manifest, affording insights not to be found in documents." Some survivor accounts have been turned into films such as Aurora Mardiganians' survivor story in the film Ravished Armenia.

In regards to the significance of eyewitness testimony, Genocide scholar Samuel Totten stated:
First-person accounts by victims and others are capable of breaking through the numbing mass of numbers in that they provide the thoughts, the passions and the voices of those who experienced and/or witnessed the terrible calamity now referred to as genocide. And while first-person accounts serve many purposes among the most significant is the fact that authentic accounts constitute valuable testimony as to what it means to be caught up in the maelstrom of hatred and savagery that is genocide.

The report of the US Ambassador to the Ottoman Empire Henry Morgenthau, Sr. is recognized to be one of the main eyewitness accounts of the genocide. Morgenthau published his memoirs about the Armenian massacres in a 1918 book Ambassador Morgenthau's Story. The book gives detailed documentation of the events and describes his appeals to stop the massacres.

Morgenthau's account and other books that provide testimonies to the events have been showcased around the world by the Armenian Genocide Museum-Institute of Yerevan, Armenia through temporary exhibitions.

Notable witnesses and testimonies

Turkish

German

Other

Christian missionaries

See also
 Armenian genocide survivors
 Press coverage of the Armenian genocide
 Recognition of the Armenian genocide

Notes
  The list excludes eyewitness accounts and survivor stories of ethnic Armenian victims and is limited to notable accounts of various diplomats, missionaries, politicians, and other notable figures irrespective of their nationality.

References

Bibliography
  - Profile at Google Books
  [ Alternate copy. ]

Further reading
 Miller, Donald E. and Lorna Touryan Miller. Survivors: An Oral History of the Armenian Genocide. Berkeley: University of California Press, 1993.
 Svazlian, Verjine. The Armenian Genocide: Testimonies of the Eyewitness Survivors. Yerevan: "Gitutiun" Publishing House of the NAS RA, 2000. Complete text (Armenian)
 Svazlian, Verjine. The Armenian Genocide and Historical Memory. Translated by Tigran Tsulikian. Yerevan: Gitutiun Publishing House, 2004.
 Dadrian, Vahakn N. Documentation of the Armenian Genocide in Turkish Sources. Jerusalem: Institute on the Holocaust and Genocide, 1991.
 United States Official Documents on the Armenian Genocide, 1915–1917, compiled by Ara Safarian. Princeton, N.J.: Gomidas Institute, 2004.
 Keith David Watenpaugh, The League of Nations Rescue of Armenian Genocide Survivors and the Making of Modern Humanitarianism, 1920–1927, American Historical Review, December 2010.
 Barton, James L. Turkish Atrocities: Statements of American Missionaries on the Destruction of Christian Communities in Ottoman Turkey, 1915–1917. Compiled by the Gomidas Institute, 1998.
 Totten, Samuel. First-person accounts of genocidal acts committed in the twentieth century: an annotated bibliography. Greenwood Press, 1991.

External links

 Eyewitnesses published by the Armenian Genocide Museum-Institute in Yerevan, Armenia
 Twenty Voices: Full length film featuring interviews with eyewitnesses and survivor stories. (YouTube video)
 Interview with an eyewitness to the Armenian Genocide – 104-year-old Armenian woman from the film Grandma's Tattoos presented by Al-Jazeera.
 Excerpts featuring survivor witnesses from the documentary film by Carlo Massa: "Destination: nowhere" (Vimeo video)
 The Forgotten, videos of interviews with survivors and witnesses
 Armenian Genocide
 Armenian Genocide Centennial

People of the Armenian genocide